Rumsey may refer to:

Places
Rumsey, Alberta
Rumsey, California
Rumsey, Kentucky

Other uses
Rumsey (surname)